is a station in Matsue, Shimane Prefecture, Japan.

Lines
West Japan Railway Company (JR West)
San'in Main Line

Adjacent stations
West Japan Railway Company (JR West)

Railway stations in Japan opened in 1908
Railway stations in Shimane Prefecture
Sanin Main Line